Evangelos Patoulidis (born 24 September 2001) is a Belgian professional footballer who plays as a midfielder for Dutch club Den Bosch, on loan from Oostende.

Professional career
Patoulidis is a product from the youth academies of Anderlecht and Standard Liège. On 15 October 2020, he signed a professional contract with Oostende. Patoulidis made his professional debut with Oostende in a 3-1 Belgian First Division A loss to Kortrijk on 29 November 2020.

On 31 August 2022, Patoulidis was loaned by Den Bosch in the Netherlands.

International career
Born in Belgium, Patoulidis is of Greek descent. He is a youth international for Belgium.

References

External links
 
 RTBF Profile
 ACFF Profile

2001 births
Belgian people of Greek descent
Footballers from Brussels
Living people
Belgian footballers
Belgium youth international footballers
Association football midfielders
K.V. Oostende players
FC Den Bosch players
Belgian Pro League players
Eerste Divisie players
Belgian expatriate footballers
Expatriate footballers in the Netherlands
Belgian expatriate sportspeople in the Netherlands